The Canton Township Carnegie Library is an historic Carnegie library at 203 North Main Street in Canton, Kansas, United States.

The library was built in 1921.  It was the last Carnegie library built in the United States with Carnegie Foundation funding. The library was added to the National Register of Historic Places in 1987.

The community received $6,000 Carnegie Foundation funding in 1916;  the library was completed in 1921.

References

External links
Library information

Library buildings completed in 1921
Libraries on the National Register of Historic Places in Kansas
Buildings and structures in McPherson County, Kansas
Carnegie libraries in Kansas
National Register of Historic Places in McPherson County, Kansas